Mkhitar Heratsi was a 12th-century Armenian physician. He was born in Khoy (present-day northwestern Iran). He was well versed in the Persian, Greek, and Arabic languages. Heratsi, is often being called the father of Armenian medicine, was the author of the Relief of Fevers, an encyclopedic work in which he discussed, among other subjects, surgery, diet and psychotherapy.

Legacy
A complete manuscript of the work was discovered in Constantinople in 1727 and acquired by the French National Library in Paris. The first complete translation of it was published in German by Ernst Seidel in 1908. Yerevan State Medical University is named after Mkhitar Heratsi since 1989  Excelling students of YSMU are awarded with "Mkhitar Heratsi scholarship".

References

External links 
 The website of Yerevan State Medical University after Mkhitar Heratsi

12th-century physicians
Armenian scientists
Medieval Armenian physicians
People from Khoy
12th-century Armenian people